Arckiv (: Archive) is a London-based fashion house that specialises in menswear fashion inspired by military and workwear. The company was founded in the late 1990s by Fraser Laing. Originally specialising in eyewear, Arckiv eventually became a menswear label in 2010 after its eyewear division became a separate company.

History 

Arckiv began as an eyewear specialist in the late 1990s, producing its own original designs but being notable for its extensive library of museum grade, antique, prototype and vintage frames, quickly becoming a renowned specialist in eyewear. The company eventually moved into the design of clothing and accessories. 

After splitting in 2010 to form two distinct companies, Arckiv became solely focused on menswear, while General Eyewear became a stand-alone company and brand formed from the continuation of the original eyewear division.

Arckiv as a label took much of its inspiration from military uniforms and labourer workwear, and its collections were categorised into three separate lines entitled Nomadic (military), Ceremonial (dress wear) and Protective (labourer and workwear). The Arckiv fashion house presents only autumn/winter collections rather than the more archetypical two collections a year, which include spring/summer. 

Arckiv presents its yearly collection on Menswear Day during London Fashion Week (September) and follows it in February with a curated exhibition of the brand in place of a spring/summer collection.

Since its first runway collection in 2010, Arckiv has been featured in numerous magazines, including Dazed & Confused, Arena Homme+ and LOVE Magazine and has featured in a number of their fashion editorials.

References

External links
 Arckiv.net
 Interview with Fraser Laing in 2010

Shops in London
Clothing companies established in 1997
British brands
Clothing brands of the United Kingdom
Clothing companies based in London
Clothing brands
2010s fashion
Clothing companies of England